The 1997 FIVB Volleyball Men's World Grand Champions Cup was held in Japan from 15 to 24 November 1997.

Qualification

Competition formula
The competition formula of the 1997 Men's World Grand Champions Cup was the single Round-Robin system. Each team plays once against each of the 5 remaining teams. Points were accumulated during the whole tournament, and the final standing was determined by the total points gained.

Squads

Venues
 Osaka-jō Hall, Osaka, Japan
 Hiroshima Green Arena, Hiroshima, Japan
 Yoyogi National Gymnasium, Tokyo, Japan

Results
All times are Japan Standard Time (UTC+09:00).

|}

Osaka round

|}

Hiroshima round

|}

Tokyo round

|}

Final standing

Team Roster
Roim, Leandro, Kid, Monzillo, Giba, Douglas, Nalbert, Gustavo, Joel, Renato Felizardo, Ricardo, Manius Abbadi
Head Coach: Radamés Lattari Filho

Awards
Best Scorer:  Nalbert Bitencourt
Best Spiker:  Bas van de Goor
Best Blocker:  Zheng Liang
Best Server:  David Beard
Best Digger:  Li Tieming
Best Setter:  Misha Latuhihin
Best Receiver:  Nalbert Bitencourt

External links
Results
Official Website

FIVB Volleyball Men's World Grand Champions Cup
World Grand Champions Cup
FIVB Men's World Grand Champions cup
V
November 1997 sports events in Asia